The Indian Journal of Psychiatry is a monthly peer-reviewed open access medical journal. It is published by Medknow Publications on behalf of the Indian Psychiatric Society. It covers research in all fields of psychiatry.

History 
The journal was established in 1949 as the Indian Journal of Neurology and Psychiatry and obtained its present name in 1958. The editor-in-chief is Om Prakash Singh  The following persons have been editors-in-chief:

Abstracting and indexing 
The journal is abstracted and indexed in Scopus, EBSCO databases, Expanded Academic ASAP, and InfoTrac.

Retraction 
In 2016, the journal retracted a 2013 supplementary paper because it plagiarized a Wikipedia article.

References

External links 
 

Psychiatry journals
Open access journals
Publications established in 1949
Medknow Publications academic journals
English-language journals
Quarterly journals
Mental health in India
Academic journals associated with learned and professional societies of India